The Limited Representative – Investment Banking Exam, commonly referred to as the Series 79, is an examination administered by the U.S. Financial Industry Regulatory Authority (FINRA) for investment banking professionals. The examination is designed to qualify candidates for a limited scope of activities as investment bankers, without the full requirements of the General Securities Representative Exam (Series 7).

See also 

 List of Securities Examinations
 Series 6
 General Securities Representative Exam (Series 7)
 Series 63
 Series 65
 Financial Industry Regulatory Authority (FINRA)
 Uniform Securities Act

References

External links 

 Content Outline, finra.org
 Proposed Rule Change to Adopt the Selection Specifications and Study Outline for the Limited Representative – Investment Banking (“Series 79”) Examination Program, finra.org

United States securities law
Professional certification in finance
Standardized tests in the United States